David Gordon may refer to:

Academics
David Gordon (economist) (1944–1996), American economist
David Gordon (philosopher) (born 1948), Ludwig von Mises Institute senior fellow

Businessmen
David Gordon (software entrepreneur) (1943–1996), American computer game publisher
David Gordon (television executive) (born 1942/3), British businessman

Performers
David Gordon (choreographer) (1936 - 2022), postmodern dancer, choreographer, and theatrical director
David Gordon (tenor) (born 1947), American concert and opera tenor

Politicians
Sir David Gordon (Australian politician) (1865–1946), South Australian politician who served in federal and state parliaments
David Gordon, 4th Marquess of Aberdeen and Temair (1908–1974), British peer and soldier
David Gordon (Ontario politician), member of the Natural Law Party and yogic flyer
David Alexander Gordon (1858–1919), Canadian politician
David F. Gordon, Head of Research at Eurasia Group, former Director of Policy Planning at the US Department of State
David William Gordon (1832–1893), Canadian politician

Sportsmen
David Gordon, former Boston College kicker who kicked the winning field goal against #1 Notre Dame in 1993 (see Holy War)
Davy Gordon (1882–1963), Scottish football player and manager

Writers
David Gordon (novelist) (born 1967), American mystery writer
 a pseudonym of Randall Garrett (1927–1987)

Characters 
David "Gordo" Gordon, fictional character from the TV series Lizzie McGuire, played by Adam Lamberg